Fumana (needle sunrose) is a small genus of flowering plants in the family Cistaceae. They are small perennial shrubs with five-lobed yellow flowers, native to rocky and sandy soils of Europe and wider Mediterranean region. Fumana shrubs can be procumbent or erect. Leaves tend to be very narrow and are almost always alternate. The genus consists of around 20 named species.

List of species
 Fumana aciphylla
 Fumana arabica
 Fumana bonapartei
 Fumana ericifolia
 Fumana ericoides
 Fumana fontanesii
 Fumana fontqueri
 Fumana grandiflora
 Fumana × heywoodii
 Fumana juniperina
 Fumana lacidulemiensis
 Fumana laevipes
 Fumana laevis
 Fumana oligosperma
 Fumana paphlagonica
 Fumana procumbens
 Fumana scoparia
 Fumana thymifolia
 Fumana trisperma

References

External links
 
 Photo gallery of Fumana species at Flora Italiana

 
Malvales genera